Pseudeurostus hilleri, the Japanese spider beetle, is a species of spider beetle in the family Ptinidae.

References

Further reading

 
 
 
 
 
 

Ptinidae
Beetles described in 1877